Reginald Prideaux Lightfoot (26 May 183618 September 1906) was a British Anglican priest. He was the Archdeacon of Oakham in the Church of England from 1880 to 1905.

Life
Lightfoot was born into an ecclesiastical family — his father, John Prideaux Lightfoot, was the Rector of Exeter College, Oxford. He was educated at Radley College and Balliol College, Oxford. He was Vicar of Wellingborough then Rector of Church of St Peter and St Paul, Uppingham from 1890 until his death. He was the Archdeacon of Oakham from 1880 to 1905, and served as Prolocutor of the Lower House of Convocation of the Province of Canterbury.

He received the degree Doctor of Divinity (DD) from the University of Oxford in March 1900.

Family
Lightfoot married in 1869 Alice Gordon Robbins, eldest daughter of George Robbins, rector of Courtenhall. Robert Henry Lightfoot was their son.

References

1836 births
People educated at Radley College
Alumni of Balliol College, Oxford
Archdeacons of Oakham
1906 deaths